A terminal tractor, known in the United States as a shunt truck, spotter truck, spotting tractor, yard truck, yard shifter, yard dog, yard goat, yard horse, yard jockey, hostler, or mule, is a kind of  semi-tractor intended to move semi-trailers within a cargo yard, warehouse facility, or intermodal facility, much like a switcher locomotive is used to position railcars. In the United Kingdom they are known as terminal lorries.

Characteristics
Distinctions between a terminal tractor and a regular tractor unit include: 
A single-person cab offset to the side of the engine.
A full-height, sliding rear door for easy access to trailer connections.
A very short wheelbase, usually with a solidly mounted rear axle.
A low-power diesel, alternative fuel engine, or electric motor usually with an automatic transmission. 
A rear window to create a 360-degree view 

Electric terminal trucks
The global EV push has given rise to a large number of all-electric terminal truck manufacturers around the world. These trucks – used in both on-road and off-road fleet – claim to be zero-emission trucks. Some of the notable manufacturers include Renault, Volvo, MAN, Orange EV, Motiv, and Tevva. Orange EV is one of the largest suppliers of zero-emission terminal trucks in the United States.

See also 

 Gladhand connector
 Sisu Terminal Systems

References

External links

Articulated vehicles
Intermodal containers
Trucks